Michael George Sadek (May 30, 1946 – January 20, 2021) was an American baseball player who was a catcher in Major League Baseball (MLB). Originally drafted by the Minnesota Twins in 1969, he spent his entire major league career with the San Francisco Giants. He was a backup throughout his eight-year major league career, which spanned the years  and  through . Sadek's nickname was "The Sheik" which was coined by Giants teammate Craig Robinson who, upon seeing the name Mohammed Ahmed Sadek, declared to the catcher, "Hey, you’re a sheik."

In the 1996 film The Fan, Sadek served as Robert De Niro's body double in scenes where DeNiro's character was throwing a baseball.

Sadek died on January 20, 2021, in San Andreas, California, at the age of 74.

References

Sources

1946 births
2021 deaths
Major League Baseball catchers
San Francisco Giants players
St. Cloud Rox players
Orlando Twins players
Charlotte Hornets (baseball) players
Amarillo Giants players
Phoenix Giants players
Baseball players from Minneapolis
Minnesota Golden Gophers baseball players